A constitutional referendum was held in Puerto Rico on 8 December 1991. The amendments would guarantee:
The inalienable right to freely and democratically determine Puerto Rico's political status.
The right to choose a dignified, non-colonial, non-territorial status not subordinate to plenary powers of Congress.
The right to vote for three alternatives.
The right that only results with a majority will be considered triumphant in a plebiscite.
The right that any status would protect Puerto Rico's culture, language and identity, and continued independent participation in international sports events.
The right that any status guarantees the individual's right to American citizenship.
The changes were rejected by 54.1% of voters, with a turnout of 60.7%.

Results

References

1991 referendums
1991
1991 in Puerto Rico
Constitutional referendums
December 1991 events in North America